V Sport is the common brand of several sports channels targeting the Nordic countries, owned by Nordic Entertainment Group. The brand has been introduced in June 2020, replacing the former brands Viasat Sport and Viasport (Norway only). Its main competitors are C More Sport and Eurosport.

Sports rights

Association football
National leagues
Eredivisie (Dutch first division)
Ligue 1 (French first division)
Premier League (English first division)
SAS Ligaen (Danish first division)
Bundesliga (German first division)
A-League (Australian first division)
National cups
Football League Cup (English league cup)
FA Cup (English cup)
European competitions
UEFA Champions League
UEFA Europa League

Other sports
American Football
National Football League (NFL)
Basketball
EuroLeague
EuroCup
Golf
PGA Tour
Ice hockey
HockeyAllsvenskan (Swedish second division)
Ice Hockey World Championships
Eliteserien/Fjordkraftligaen (Norwegian first division)
World Cup of Hockey
Kontinental Hockey League (KHL)
Motorsports
Formula One
IndyCar
MotoGP
NASCAR
DTM

Channels
Viasat Sport was launched as a pan-Nordic channel in 1999. In January 2002, a dedicated Danish channel, Viasat Sport Denmark, launched and replaced the pan-Nordic version in Denmark.

1 February 2004, Viasat launched two new sport channels; Viasat Sport 2 and Viasat Sport 3. The two existing channels were re-branded as Viasat Sport 1. During the autumn the two new channels were refocused, turning Viasat Sport 2 into a dedicated soccer channel and Viasat Sport 3 becoming a channel for motor and contact sports.

In April 2005, a "news channel" called Viasat Sport 24 was launched.

In the end of 2005, Viasat Sport 1 in Norway was replaced by SportN, a joint venture with government-owned public broadcaster NRK .

In January 2007, a dedicated golf channel, Viasat Golf, was launched replacing Viasat Sport 24.

11 April 2007, Viasat Sport 1 in Denmark was replaced by TV 2 Sport, a joint venture with state-owned broadcaster TV 2.

In early 2008, Viasat launched their first high-definition sports channels: TV 2 Sport HD for Denmark and Viasat Sport HD för Norway and Sweden.

On October 17, 2008, the Viasat Sport channels went through a major overhaul which saw Viasat Sport 2 and 3 disappear in Sweden and Norway. They were replaced by Viasat Fotboll (in Sweden), Viasat Sport (in Norge) and Viasat Motor (both countries). The Swedish Viasat Sport 1 was renamed Viasat Sport. Viasat Sport HD continued to be available in both Norway and Sweden, and Viasat Golf was still available in all four Scandinavian countries.

Viasat Sport 2 and 3 continued in Denmark, Finland and the Baltics until January 6, 2009. On January 7, 2009, Viasat Sport Baltic channel was launched in Baltic states. Viasat Golf also became available in the region. Finland and Denmark didn't receive any replacements for Viasat Sport 2 and 3.

The Baltic business was sold in 2017 to Providence Equity Partners, and Viasat Sport Baltic has been renamed to TVPlay Sports (currently TV3 Sport). In 2018 the Nordic TV business of Modern Times Group was split off into Nordic Entertainment Group (NENT).

Denmark
Channel lineup:
TV3 Sport 
TV3+ 
TV3 MAX
V Sport Golf
V Sport Live
V Sport Ultra HD

Finland
Channel lineup:
V Sport 1 Suomi
V Sport 2 Suomi
V Sport + Suomi
V Sport 1
V Sport Football
V Sport Golf
V Sport Vinter
V Sport Premium
V Sport Live
V Sport Ultra HD
ESportsTV

Norway

New channel lineup as of 15 September 2008:
V Sport +
V Sport 1
V Sport 2
V Sport 3
V Sport Golf
V Sport Premier League 1
V Sport Premier League 2
V Sport Premier League 3
V Sport Premier League 4
V Sport Live
V Sport Ultra HD

Sweden

New channel lineup as of 16 September 2009:
V Sport Football
V Sport Golf
V Sport Motor
V Sport Vinter
V Sport 1
V Sport Premium
V Sport Extra
V Sport Live
V Sport Ultra HD

References

External links
Viasat Sport Norway
Viasat Sport Sweden

Mass media companies of Sweden
Modern Times Group
Television channels and stations established in 2004
V Sport